Louis Frederick II, Prince of Schwarzburg-Rudolstadt (Rudolstadt, 9 August 1767 – Rudolstadt, 28 April 1807) was from 1793 to 1807 reigning Prince of Schwarzburg-Rudolstadt.

Life 
Louis Frederick was born on 9 August 1767 in Rudolstadt and was the second child and first son of the then Hereditary Prince Frederick Charles of Schwarzburg-Rudolstadt and his first wife Princess Auguste of Schwarzburg-Rudolstadt. At that time his grandfather Louis Günther II was ruling over the principality. In 1789 Louis Frederick and his brother Karl Günther went to Geneva and other destinations for their education. During this journey they learned about the events of the French Revolution.

On July 21, 1791 in Homburg he married Caroline of Hesse-Homburg, daughter of Frederick V, Landgrave of Hesse-Homburg.

Issue 

From the marriage of the Prince with Caroline were born the following children:
 Princess Carolina Augusta of Schwarzburg-Rudolstadt (1792–1794)
 Friedrich Günther (1793–1867), Prince of Schwarzburg-Rudolstadt
 ∞ 1. 1816 Princess Auguste of Anhalt-Dessau (1793–1854), 
 ∞ 2. 1855 Princess Helena von Anhalt-Dessau (1835–1860), 
 ∞ 3. 1861 Lydia Maria Schultze (1840–1909), 
 Princess Thekla of Schwarzburg-Rudolstadt (1795–1861),  
 ∞ 1817 Otto Victor, Prince of Schönburg-Waldenburg (1785–1859),
 Princess Caroline of Schwarzburg-Rudolstadt (*/† 1796), 
 Albert (1798–1869), Prince of Schwarzburg-Rudolstadt
 ∞ 1827 Princess Auguste Luise of Solms-Braunfels (1804–1865),
 Prince Bernhard of Schwarzburg-Rudolstadt (1801–1816),
 Prince Rudolf of Schwarzburg-Rudolstadt (1801–1808).

Bibliography 
 Heinrich Friedrich Theodor Apfelstedt: Das Haus Kevernburg-Schwarzburg von seinem Ursprunge bis auf unsere Zeit: dargestellt in den Stammtafeln seiner Haupt- und Nebenlinien und mit biographischen Notizen über die wichtigsten Glieder derselben, Bertram, Sondershausen 1890,  
 Jens Henkel, Lutz Unbehaun, Frank Esche, Horst Fleischer: Die Fürsten von Schwarzburg-Rudolstadt, (Broschiert - 1997)
 Johann Christian August Junghans: Geschichte der schwarzburgischen Regenten, Leipzig 1821 E-Text
 Heinrich Schöppl: Die Regenten des Fürstentums Schwarzburg-Rudolstadt, Rudolstadt 1915.

1767 births
1807 deaths
House of Schwarzburg
Princes of Schwarzburg-Rudolstadt